Hokkien Kelantan is a mixed language spoken by about 20,000 people in northern Malaya. It derives from Hokkien Chinese, Southern Thai and Kelantan Malay, with increasing influence from standard Malay. It is not mutually intelligible with local Kelantan Hokkien, and speakers do not identify as ethnically Hokkien.

References

Mixed languages
Hokkien
Tai languages
Malay dialects
Languages of Malaysia